Ayyangeri  is a village in the southern state of Karnataka, India. It is located in the Madikeri taluk of Kodagu district.

References

External links
 http://Kodagu.nic.in/

Villages in Kodagu district